Muhammad Taufiq Kiemas (31 December 1942 – 8 June 2013) was an Indonesian politician, who served as the Speaker of the People's Consultative Assembly of Indonesia from 2009 until his death in 2013. A member of the Indonesian Democratic Party of Struggle (PDI-P), he was the husband of Megawati Sukarnoputri, president of Indonesia from 2001 to 2004.

Early life, education, and marriage

Early life and education 
Taufiq was born to the couple Tjik Agus Kiemas and Hamzathoen Roesyda. His father was from South Sumatra, while his mother was of Minangkabau descent. He was the head of his mother's family in Tanah Datar, West Sumatra, with the title Datuk Basa Batuah. Taufiq was educated at the Faculty of Law of Sriwijaya University and was an active member of the Indonesian National Student Movement (GMNI), when he was a student.

Marriage 
In 1973, he married Megawati Sukarnoputri, the daughter of Indonesia's first president, Sukarno. The marriage was Megawati's third marriage, and together they had a daughter, Puan Maharani, who is currently serving as the Speaker of the People's Representative Council. Taufiq also had two half-sons from Megawati's previous marriage.

Political career

Early political career 
Taufiq Kiemas started his political career when he was a student by joining the GMNI. He then joined the Indonesian Democratic Party and was elected as a member of the People's Representative Council in 1992. During the New Order era, his political career was largely castrated by the authorities.

Post-new order 
His career began to shine after the New Order regime was overthrown by students and the public in 1998. In the 1999 legislative election, the Indonesian Democratic Party of Struggle (PDI-P) came out victorious. This victory led his wife to become the Vice President of the Republic of Indonesia and then on July 23 2001 became the fifth President of Indonesia replacing Abdurrahman Wahid after Wahid's mandate was revoked by the People's Consultative Assembly.

Now as one of the important figures in the party, he serves as Chairman of the Central Advisory Council, and was re-elected as a member of the People's Representative Council for the 2009–2014 period from the Electoral District of West Java II. Taufiq was the leader of the PDI-P's Muslim religious wing. He was a well-known participant in PDI-P affairs, often commenting on national matters such as preparations for the 2014 legislative and presidential elections in Indonesia and sometimes differing with his wife on certain issues concerning the management and leadership of the party.

Health and death 
Taufiq Kiemas suffered from heart and kidney problems. He had bypass surgery in Australia in 2000, another operation in 2005 to install a pacemaker, and another to replace the pacemaker battery. Taufiq had also been hospitalized on a number of occasions after the treatment. 

Taufiq Kiemas died on 8 June 2013 in Singapore General Hospital, Singapore after a heart attack. The following day his body was flown back to Jakarta in an Indonesian Air Force Hercules cargo aircraft where he was given a full state funeral and buried at the Kalibata Heroes Cemetery. The President of Indonesia, president Susilo Bambang Yudhoyono presided over the official ceremony which was attended by the senior members of Taufiq's family, the Indonesian Cabinet, and hundreds of leading political and national figures.

Legacy 
Taufiq wrote a number of books, most notably his biography, "Gelora Kebangsaan Tak Kunjung Padam" ("The National Spirit Remains Alive") which recounted both episodes of his life and his thoughts about various national issues. It was launched in December 2012 to celebrate his 70th birthday.

In 2021, Pekon Serai Airport in Pesisir Barat Regency, Lampung was renamed after him.

Awards 
 11 August 2011 – Star of the Republic of Indonesia Adipradana. 
 10 March 2013 – Honoris Causa Doctorate in Nationality and State by Trisakti University.

References

1942 births
2013 deaths
People from Jakarta
Indonesian Muslims
Indonesian people of Malay descent
Minangkabau people
First ladies and gentlemen of Indonesia
Speakers of the People's Consultative Assembly
Indonesian Democratic Party of Struggle politicians
Sukarno family
Sriwijaya University alumni